The Uitmarkt is the opening of the cultural season in Amsterdam, held every year over a weekend at the end of August, usually on and around the Leidseplein, Museumplein (museum square) and Nieuwmarkt. Many theatres open their doors for free, showcasing several genres like classical music, ballet, hiphop, cabaret, literary recitals, and film. Besides that, there are stands on the square and surrounding streets selling books or giving information on various cultural events of the next year. 

The image shows Symfonisch Blaasorkest ATH performing with singer Gé Reinders at the 2006 edition of the Uitmarkt.

The name literally means outmarket, referring to 'going out' (to see a show).

References

External links

 

Culture in Amsterdam